Florrie R. Burke, M.Ed., MA, LMFT, is a human rights advocate, specializing in combating human trafficking.   Secretary of State John Kerry presented Ms. Burke with the inaugural Presidential Award for Extraordinary Efforts to Combat Trafficking in Persons in May 2013. The Award was granted in recognition of “her sustained dedication and unparalleled leadership in combating modern slavery through the development and delivery of comprehensive services, the empowerment of survivors to move from slavery to independence, and the transformation of policy to eradicate all forms of human trafficking.”

Florrie Burke is a consultant on Human Trafficking and Modern Day Slavery to both governmental and non-governmental agencies.  With a decade and a half of specialized experience, she is a leading expert on the victim-centered approach in human trafficking cases and collaborative efforts of criminal justice actors and victim care providers. She is a founding member and currently Chair Emeritus of the Freedom Network, serves as advisor to the Freedom Network Training Institute and is on the Steering Committee of the New York Anti-Trafficking Network. She has done extensive training, speaking and consultation on Human Trafficking issues, trauma and torture in the United States, and internationally. She serves as an expert witness on cases of human trafficking. She is a member of the Global Training Initiative on Human Trafficking at the UNODC in Vienna and is on the faculty of the Warnath Group, developing materials and training for first responders, criminal justice actors and others. Ms. Burke has been working with trafficked persons since 1997 when she designed and implemented specialized social services to sixty deaf Mexicans who were held in slavery in a peddling ring in New York City. She helped start the Anti-Trafficking Program at Safe Horizon in 2001 and also designed and implemented a model for Community Trauma Response following the attacks on September 11th. In 2007 Ms. Burke received the National Crime Victims Recognition Service Award from the Department of Justice, Office for Victims of Crime. She has been honored by the Civil Rights Division of the Department of Justice, by the Wage and Hour Division of the United States Department of Labor, and was awarded the Annual Paul and Sheila Wellstone Award by the Freedom Network USA.

Florrie is a lesbian and her partner of over 30 years was Barbara Hammer up until her death.

References

Anti–human trafficking activists
Living people
Year of birth missing (living people)
American lesbians
Queer people
Lesbian feminists